Złota Maska (Polish for Golden Mask) is a Polish melodrama film directed by Jan Fethke based on two novels by Tadeusz Dołęga-Mostowicz. Although shot and scheduled for release in 1939, the post-production was interrupted by the outbreak of World War II, the subsequent need to pass German censorship meant it received only limited release in occupied Poland in 1940. The copy which survived has altered credits and subplot removed — scenes with Igo Sym (Nazi collaborator) were cut after the war.

Cast 
 Lidia Wysocka – Magda Nieczaj
 Aleksander Żabczyński – Ksawery Runicki
 Władysław Walter – Nieczaj, father of Magda and Adela
 Mieczysława Ćwiklińska – Runicka, Ksawery's mother
 Maria Buchwald – Adela Nieczaj
 Irena Wasiutyńska – Mira Borychowska
 Stefan Hnydziński – Biesiadowski
 Józef Orwid – uncle Zaklesiński
 Jerzy Kobusz – Kamionka, the apprentice
 Zofia Wilczyńska – chambermaid
 Leszek Pośpiełowski – count Gucio
 Andrzej Bogucki – baron Wolski
 Aleksander Bogusiński – Jan, the butler
 Feliks Żukowski – Pieczynga, the estate manager
 Janina Krzymuska – Polkowska
 Helena Zarembina – gossiper
 Wanda Orzechowska – Karnicka
 Jadwiga Zaklicka – Mira's friend
 Igo Sym – Raszewski

References

External links 
 

1940s Polish-language films
Polish black-and-white films
Films based on Polish novels
Films based on multiple works
Films based on works by Tadeusz Dołęga-Mostowicz
Polish drama films
Melodrama films
1940 drama films
1940 films